Basket Case 2 is a 1990 American comedy horror film written and directed by Frank Henenlotter, and the sequel to the 1982 film Basket Case. It stars Kevin Van Hentenryck as Duane Bradley, who moves with his deformed, formerly conjoined twin brother Belial into a home for "unique individuals" run by their long-lost aunt, eccentric philanthropist Granny Ruth (played by Annie Ross).

The film spawned another sequel, Basket Case 3: The Progeny, in 1991.

Plot
After falling from an apartment building at the end of the first film, Duane Bradley and his deformed, surgically-separated conjoined twin brother Belial are taken to the hospital. Their unusual situation draws media attention, making it impossible to lead a secret life. They are rescued from the hospital by Granny Ruth, who saw their story on the news. She takes them to her home, where she and her granddaughter Susan care for an extended family of similarly deformed individuals. Among these individuals is Eve, who is similar to Belial in that she is a bodiless torso. Traumatized by how she has been treated prior to Ruth rescuing her, Eve is mute and spends most of her time in the attic. A few years pass and as Eve and Belial fall in love, Duane's resentment of Belial grows. He hasn't forgiven Belial for Sharon's death and wishes to live a life without being surrounded by "freaks", as previously he had been unable to leave Belial due to their psychic bond.

During all of this a sleazy reporter named Marcie and her equally sleazy photographer has been looking for the Bradley brothers in order to bring them to justice. Upon discovering the freaks Marcie decides that she will expose them to the world, forcing Ruth and the others to stop her. They kill the photographer, as well as a private detective that was assisting Marcie. Duane tricks Marcie into allowing the freaks into her home under the guise that Belial wants an interview; Belial mutilates her face, turning her into a freak as well.

That night the freaks celebrate their victory while Eve and Belial consummate their relationship in the attic. Seeing this as an opportunity to finally be free of Belial, Duane approaches Susan and asks her to run away with him. She is horrified that he would leave his brother and reveals that she, too, is a freak. She has been pregnant for six years as her baby refuses to leave her womb. This shatters the last of Duane's psyche and he kills Susan by pushing her out a window. He then goes to Belial and forcibly sews him to his body. The film ends as Ruth and the others discover what Duane has done, and stare at him horrified.

Cast 
 Kevin Van Hentenryck as Duane Bradley
 Annie Ross as Granny Ruth
 Kathryn Meisle as Marcie Elliott
 Heather Rattray as Susan Smoeller
 Jason Evers as Lou
 Ted Sorel as Phil
 Beverly Bonner as Casey
 Matt Mitler as Arty
 Leonard Jackson as Police Commissioner
 David Emge as Half Moon
 Judy Grafe as News Woman
 Chad Brown as News Man
 Tom Franco as Frog Boy
 Tom Tolan as Belial Bradley (voice; uncredited)

Reception 
The staff of Variety called Basket Case 2 "a hilarious genre spoof" that pays homage to the 1932 film Freaks. Kevin Thomas of the Los Angeles Times complimented the film's atmosphere, which he felt was aided by the cinematography and score, and highlighted Ross and Van Hentenryck's performances. He wrote that Basket Case 2 "has everything it needs to become the cult film that its 1982 predecessor has been: outrageous dark humor, bizarre horror, driving energy and genuine pathos."

Joe Kane of the New York Daily News gave the film a mostly positive review, commending its "dark wit" and exploration of Duane and Belial's romantic pursuits. He wrote that, "While the interior-bound sequel lacks the original's sleazy Times Square ambience, and most of the flick's secondary freaks are more whimsical than menacing in design [...] Basket Case 2 stacks up as fun fear fare for Basket Case cultists, fright-film fans and adventurous viewers of every stripe." The New York Times Caryn James wrote, "As cheap horror spoofs go, this one isn't all bad", but lamented a perceived deviation from an initial "tongue-in-cheek approach" as the film progresses, writing, "Twenty minutes or so into the movie, there is very little left to surprise you, except an exceptionally tacky ending."

In his 2011 book Horror Films of the 1990s, John Kenneth Muir opined that Basket Case 2 was "disappointing" and that it "eschews all the qualities that made the down-and-dirty, low-budget original such a great pleasure."

On the review aggregator website Rotten Tomatoes, the film has an approval rating of 71% based on seven surveyed critics, with an average rating was 6.3/10.

Home media 
Basket Case 2 was released on DVD by Synapse Films in October 2007.

Sequel

References

External links 
 
 

1990 films
1990 horror films
1990s slasher films
1990 romantic comedy films
American comedy horror films
American sequel films
American slasher films
American monster movies
Films about twin brothers
Films directed by Frank Henenlotter
Puppet films
Parasitic twinning in culture
Films scored by Joe Renzetti
1990s English-language films
1990 direct-to-video films
1990s American films